Naked Yoga is a short documentary released in 1974 and illustrates the practice of yoga in a natural setting and in the nude. The film includes images of women practicing yoga in Cyprus and in a studio. These visuals are interspersed with images of Eastern art and psychedelic effects. The narrator also relates the practice to Buddhist philosophy. It was shown on television in the UK, however it has not been released to video.

This documentary short was nominated for an Oscar in 1975, in the category Best Documentary Short Subject.

Naked Yoga had previously been thought to be a lost film. Ed Carter, documentary curator at the Academy Film Archive, began searching for the film in 2004 and eventually located a Technicolor print of the film with the help of the film's cinematographer, Michael Elphick, in 2011. That print served as the source for the archive's restoration of the film in 2012, in partnership with the British Film Institute.

See also

Nudity in film

References

External links

1974 films
1970s short documentary films
1970s rediscovered films
1974 documentary films
British short documentary films
Yoga mass media
1970s English-language films
1970s British films